Home Movie is a 2016 short documentary biographical film, written and directed by Caroline Pick.

Synopsis 
For over 50 years, home movies filmed by Caroline Pick's father lay unnoticed in a wardrobe. Pick, now over 60 years old, finds them while clearing it out during a house move. Her father filmed the reels in Czechoslovakia and the UK, and when she does go through them, she is exposed to things her parents kept secret, hints about the family's past, lost relatives, and other things they were silent about. She embarks on a journey to fill in the gaps, as she compares and contrasts the happy images of the family in 1950s Cardiff and 1930s Europe, which belie the tragedies that lie behind the smiles. What the film discovers and concludes is a dark and secret doom, relating to immigration, dislocation and death.

Awards  
 2015: Women Over 50 Film Festival – Best Documentary

Official festival screenings 
 San Francisco Jewish Film Festival
 Berlin Jewish Film Festival
 Toronto Jewish Film Festival
 Jerusalem Jewish Film Festival
 New York Jewish Film Festival
 London Short Film Festival
 Open City DocFest 
 UK Jewish Film Festival 
 Brighton Cinecity Film Festival

References

External links 
 

2016 short documentary films
2016 films
British short documentary films
British biographical films
Films about Jews and Judaism
Holocaust films
2010s biographical films
Biographical documentary films
2010s English-language films
2010s British films